Koretz is a surname. Notable people with the surname include:

Leo Koretz (1879-1925), American lawyer and stockbroker
Paul Koretz (born 1955), American politician

Jewish surnames